The epi tes katastaseos was a court office of the Byzantine Empire, attested in the 9th–10th centuries.

The origin and exact nature of the office are unclear.

References

Sources
 
 

Byzantine palace offices
Byzantine court titles
Ceremonial occupations